KUTU-CD, virtual channel 25 (UHF digital channel 17), is a low-powered, Class A dual Univision/Telemundo-affiliated television station licensed to Tulsa, Oklahoma, United States. The station is owned by the Tyler Media Group. KUTU-CD's programming and advertising sales offices are located at Eastland Plaza (on East 21st Street and South 145th East Avenue) in southeast Tulsa, and its transmitter is located atop the Bank of America Center (at the corner of West 6th Street and South Boulder Avenue West) in downtown Tulsa. Master control and some internal operations are based at the facilities of sister stations and fellow Univision and Telemundo affiliates KUOK and KTUZ-TV near Southeast 51st Street and Shields Boulevard in southern Oklahoma City.

On cable, KUTU-CD is available on Cox Communications channel 14 in both standard and high definition.

History

The station was founded on December 30, 1994, as very low-power K25FF; the call letters were never used on-air. The station was finally granted a license sometime in 1996 under the call letters KLOT-LP. The station was then sold to Little Rock, Arkansas-based Equity Broadcasting Corporation (later Equity Media Holdings), under the licensee "Woodward Broadcasting, Inc.", in 2004. On March 1, 2005, the station changed its call letters to KUTU-CA, and became an affiliate of Spanish–language network Univision.

On June 25, 2008, Equity announced that it was selling KUTU to Luken Communications, LLC. The sale preceded Equity Media Holdings' Chapter 11 bankruptcy protection filing in December 2008; offers by Luken Communications to acquire Equity-owned stations in six markets were later withdrawn. KUTU-CA was later sold at auction to the Oklahoma City-based Tyler Media Group on April 16, 2009. The following year, the station filed a construction permit to move to UHF channel 45 and at the same time, upgrade its transmitter's effective radiated power from 5.06 kilowatts to about 25 kilowatts. In December 2011, KUTU-CA shut down its analog signal and flash-cut its digital signal into operation on UHF channel 25; its call letters were also modified to KUTU-CD.

Digital channels
The station's digital signal is multiplexed:

Newscasts
In August 2011, KUTU began simulcasting Spanish language newscasts (airing weeknights at 5 and 10 p.m.) produced by Telemundo-affiliated sister station KTUZ-TV in Oklahoma City, upon the rebranding of its newscasts as Accion Oklahoma (a variant of the Action News branding). Weather forecast segments during the newscasts include current conditions and seven-day forecasts for both the Tulsa and Oklahoma City metropolitan areas. As Univision airs its national late-night news program Noticiero Univision: Edicion Nocturna at 10:30 p.m., KUTU signs off from the 10 p.m. edition of Accion Oklahoma five minutes before the conclusion of the broadcast on KTUZ (which an additional segment that runs until rejoining Telemundo programming at 10:35 p.m.).

See also
KUOK

References

External links
 KUTU-CD1 official website
 KUTU-CD2 official website
 Tyler Media corporate website
 Univision official website
 

UTU-CD
Television channels and stations established in 1994
UTU-CD
Equity Media Holdings
Low-power television stations in the United States
1994 establishments in Oklahoma
Univision network affiliates
Telemundo network affiliates